Forest Hill or Forrest Hill may refer to:

Places

Australia 
 Forest Hill, New South Wales, a suburb of Wagga Wagga
 Forrest Hill, New South Wales, a suburb of Albury
 Forest Hill, Queensland
 Forest Hill, Victoria
 Forest Hill Chase Shopping Centre
 Electoral district of Forest Hill, an electoral district in Victoria

Canada
 Forest Hill, Toronto, Ontario, Canada
 Forest Hill (electoral district), Ontario
 Forest Hill, Guysborough, Nova Scotia
 Forest Hill, Kings, Nova Scotia
 Forest Hills, Nova Scotia

United Kingdom 
 Forest Hill, London, a suburb 
 Forest Hill railway station
 Forest Hill School
 Forest Hill, Oxfordshire
 Forest Hill, Wiltshire

United States 
 Foresthill, California
 Forest Hill, San Francisco, California, a neighborhood
 Forest Hill Station (San Francisco), a Muni Metro station
 Forest Hill, Indiana
 Forest Hill, Kansas
 Forest Hill (Danville, Kentucky), listed on the National Register of Historic Places listings in Boyle County, Kentucky
 Forest Hill, Louisiana
 Forest Hill, Maryland
 Forest Hill, Newark, New Jersey
 Forest Hill, Ohio, a neighborhood in Cleveland Heights and East Cleveland
 Forest Hill, Oklahoma
 Forest Hill, Texas
 Forest Hill (Amherst, Virginia), a historic home in Amherst County, Virginia
 Forest Hill, Richmond, Virginia, a neighborhood
 Forest Hill, West Virginia
 Forest Hill Cemetery (disambiguation)

Elsewhere
 Forrest Hill, New Zealand, a suburb of Auckland
 Forest Hill, Gauteng, South Africa

People
Forrest Hill (artist), a mural-painter of a Montana post office

See also
 Forest Hills (disambiguation)
 Forest Hill Cemetery (disambiguation)
 Forest Hill Historic District (disambiguation)
 Forest Hill Park (disambiguation)
 Forest Hill station (disambiguation)